Jay Lawrence Arnold (September 9, 1912 – April 8, 1982) was a professional American football player in the National Football League. He is one of only 6 NFL players to have a receiving touchdown, a fumble recovery for a TD and an interception TD in the same season in 1938.  He was born in Rogers, Texas.  He played halfback, fullback, wingback (quarterback) and defensive back.

References

1912 births
1982 deaths
People from Rogers, Texas
Players of American football from Texas
American football defensive backs
American football running backs
American football quarterbacks
Pittsburgh Steelers players
Philadelphia Eagles players
Texas Longhorns football players